The Walk the Line Festival was a music and poetry festival which took place at various venues in Cheltenham, southern England.

The first Walk the Line festival took place on Friday 30 and Saturday 31 October 2009.

2011 line-up
 Ellen and the Escapades
 Beans on Toast
 Crazy Arm
 Tellison
 Charlie Baxter
 Swift Maneuver
 We are The Afterglow
 I The Lion
 Pink Crudge Caravan
 The Peppermint Hunting Lodge
 Miss 600
 Changing Horses
 Midwest Dilemma
 Jim Wain
 Ellie Dussek
 Tina Lundelius
 Nina Condron
 Joe Noel
 4BEL
 Thrill Collins

2010 line-up
 Brown Torpedo
 Midnight Mile
 Jim Lockey & The Solemn Sun
 The Dawn Chorus
 David Ford
 Hitchhikers of the Galaxy
 The Echoes
 Reachback
 Will Kevans
 I Call A Strike
 Che
 Joe Noel
 Pete Taylor
 Gareth Harper
 Thrill Collins
 Dale Campbell
 Ryan Martin
 Edd Donovan
 Faded Circus
 My First Tooth
 The Strange Death of Liberal England
 6 Day Riot

2009 line-up
 8-fold
 Ben Marwood
 Broadcast 2000
 Byron Vincent
 Chris T-T
 Crazy Arm
 Crowns on Rats Orchestra
 Fighting Fiction
 Lets Tea Party
 Oxygen Thief
 Post War Years
 Sam Isaac
 Talons
 This Town Needs Guns
 Thrill Collins
 Tubelord

References

External links
 Walk the Line Festival website

October events
Music festivals in Gloucestershire
Poetry festivals in the United Kingdom
Festivals in Cheltenham
2009 establishments in England
Music festivals established in 2009
Literary festivals in England